Amélie Mauresmo was the defending champion and successfully defended her title, defeating Patty Schnyder 2–6, 6–3, 6–4 in the final.

Seeds
The first eight seeds received a bye into the second round.

Draw

Finals

Top half

Section 1

Section 2

Bottom half

Section 3

Section 4

References
 Main and Qualifying Draws

Women's Singles
Italian Open - Singles